Beşyol is a village in the Eceabat District of Çanakkale Province in Turkey. Its population is 177 (2021).

References

Villages in Eceabat District